Faisal Fanoos (born 6 October 1997) is an Indian cricketer. He made his List A debut on 28 February 2021, for Kerala in the 2020–21 Vijay Hazare Trophy.

References

External links
 

1997 births
Living people
Indian cricketers
Kerala cricketers
Place of birth missing (living people)